Chevilly may mean:

Chevilly, Switzerland in the canton of Vaud
in France:
 Chevilly, Loiret
 Chevilly-Larue, Val-de-Marne